Seybert is a spelling variant of the German language surname Seibert. Notable people with the name include:
 Adam Seybert (1773–1825), politician from Philadelphia
 Joanna Seybert (1946), United States federal judge
 John Seybert (1791–1860), American bishop

References 

German-language surnames
Surnames from given names